Mahalia Burkmar (born 1 May 1998), known mononymously as Mahalia, is a British singer, songwriter and actress. Mahalia has released several EPs and two albums, Diary of Me (2016) and Love and Compromise (2019). She also acted in the film Brotherhood (2016). She had her breakthrough in 2017 with her performance of "Sober" for the YouTube channel Colors. In 2018, she was ranked number one on YouTube's Ones to Watch list.

Life and career
Mahalia is from Syston, Charnwood, in Leicestershire. She was born to musician parents. Her father is British-Irish and her mother is Jamaican. Mahalia has described the town she grew up in as a predominantly white area with "a lot of racism". She has two brothers.

She attended Roundhill Community College until she signed a record deal aged 13, when she transferred to a performing arts school, Birmingham Ormiston Academy,where she took acting classes.

As a child she would often spend her summer breaks at home writing music—she wrote her first song at age eight and signed a deal with Asylum Records at age 13. She performed live for the first time aged "eleven, or maybe 12" at an open mic and spent eight years of her life as a backing singer for a number of artists including Rihanna and Kehlani. She released her debut EP, Head Space, in 2012. Mahalia was later introduced to Ed Sheeran, who she went on to perform as a supporting act for.

In 2019, Mahalia was featured on BBC Radio 1's Brit List. Her album Love and Compromise was released on marketed as her debut album. The album concept was influenced by an interview with Eartha Kitt, which Mahalia's mother showed her when she was a child.

Mahalia won Best Female Act and Best R&B/Soul Act at the 2020 MOBO Awards.

In 2021, she released "Jealous", a collaboration with American rapper Rico Nasty. She was nominated for her first Grammy Award for Best R&B Performance at the 63rd Annual Grammy Awards. Mahalia was included in the 2021 Forbes 30 Under 30 list.

In 2022, Mahalia was among the performers at the Birmingham 2022 Commonwealth Games. She was also one of the opening acts in the all-female lineup at Adele's  British Summer Time concerts in London's Hyde Park.

Influences 
Mahalia has listed Corinne Bailey Rae, Erykah Badu, Lauryn Hill, Amy Winehouse, Jill Scott, India Arie, Ed Sheeran, and Kate Nash among her musical influences.

Discography

Studio albums

Extended plays

Singles

Guest appearances

Awards and nominations

Filmography
 Brotherhood (Noel Clarke, 2016) – she played Thea

References

External links

1998 births
Living people
21st-century Black British women singers
Black British actresses
English women singer-songwriters
English people of Irish descent
English people of Jamaican descent
Musicians from Leicestershire
People from Syston